Mario Adolfo del Carmen Fernández Baeza (born 22 November 1947 in Rancagua) is a Chilean lawyer, professor and politician, member of the Christian Democratic Party. He served as the Minister of the Interior and Public Security in Michelle Bachelet's second term.

Previously he served as Minister of State of president Ricardo Lagos, minister of the Chilean Constitutional Court (2006-2011), and ambassador of Chile to Germany, Austria, and Uruguay.

Studies and academic career 
He studied in the Public School Nª 3 and the Liceo de Hombres, both in his native town. He was secretary and vice-president of the Students Centre of his school, and its delegate in two National Congresses of Secondary Students. He also was member of the Youth of Catholic Students.

Later he studied in the Universidad de Chile Law School in Valparaíso, between 1967 and 1969, when he moved to the Law School in Santiago. He got a grade in Juridical and Social Sciences in 1975. Afterwards he earned  doctorates in political science, history, international right public and philosophy from Heidelberg University, Germany.

He has been Law professor in the Diego Portales University, Pontifical Catholic University of Chile and University of Chile, among others.

Political and public career 
He joined the Christian Democrat Party in 1966. He served as undersecretary of Aviation and War during the governments of the presidents Patricio Aylwin and Eduardo Frei Ruiz-Tagle (1990-1993, 1994-1995 and 1996-1999).

In 2000 he was appointed by president Ricardo Lagos as minister of National Defence, until 2002, when a cabinet reshuffle assigned the Ministry to Michelle Bachelet, and Fernández was named Minister General Secretariat of the Presidency (2002-2003). Later he was designated ambassador to Germany.

On 13 December 2005, the Senate appointed him minister of the Constitutional Court of Chile, starting on 1 January 2006. He resigned on 31 March 2011, to join the consulting firm Latinus and restart his teaching classes in different universities.

In 2014 he assumed, in the second term of Michelle Bachelet, as ambassador to Germany, being reassigned in mid-2015 to Uruguay. On 8 June 2016, president Bachelet appointed him as minister of the Interior and Public Security, in replacement of the renounced Jorge Burgos.

Beliefs 
Fernández is an Opus Dei member.

Works 
 Más allá de la transición, Santiago, 1986
 Las políticas sociales en el Cono Sur, 1975-1985, Santiago, 1986
 (ed., with Dieter Nohlen and O. Bareiro) Kooperation und Konflikt im La Plata-Becken, Saarbrücken/Fort Lauderdale, 1986
 (with Dieter Nohlen and A. van Klaveren) Demokratie und Aussenpolitik in Lateinamerika, Opladen, 1991
 (with Dieter Nohlen) Presidencialismo versus parlamentarismo en América Latina, Caracas, 1991
 (with Dieter Nohlen) El Presidencialismo renovado, Caracas, 1998

References 

20th-century Chilean lawyers
University of Chile alumni
Heidelberg University alumni
Ambassadors of Chile to Germany
Ambassadors of Chile to Austria
Ambassadors of Chile to Uruguay
Philosophers of law
Chilean Ministers of Defense
Chilean Ministers of the Interior
Chilean Ministers Secretary General of the Presidency
1947 births
Christian Democratic Party (Chile) politicians
People from Rancagua
Liceo Bicentenario Óscar Castro Zúñiga alumni
Living people